Verkhny Rubezh is a rural locality (a selo) in Almozerskoye Rural Settlement, Vytegorsky District, Vologda Oblast, Russia. The population was 60 as of 2002.

Geography 
Verkhny Rubezh is located 43 km southeast of Vytegra (the district's administrative centre) by road. Sredny Rubezh is the nearest rural locality.

References 

Rural localities in Vytegorsky District